Raven Klaasen and Michael Venus were the reigning champions from when the tournament was last held in 2019, but both players chose to participate with different partners.

Klaasen partnered alongside Ben McLachlan and successfully defended his title, defeating Venus and Neal Skupski in the final, 7–6(7–4), 6–4.

Seeds

Draw

Draw

Qualifying

Seeds

Qualifiers

Qualifying draw

References

External Links
Main Draw
Qualifying Draw

Citi Open - Doubles